Johan Mulder is a South African rugby union player for the  in the Currie Cup. His regular position is scrum-half.

Mulder was named in the  squad for the 2021 Currie Cup Premier Division.

References

South African rugby union players
Living people
Rugby union scrum-halves
Blue Bulls players
Year of birth missing (living people)
Griquas (rugby union) players